Bhargaon is a village located in the Almora district of Uttarakhand state, India. close to Ranikhet and Chaubatia at an altitude of 1850M or 6,070 feet above sea level. The village had a population of 469 in 2011. Bhargaon, is an as yet un-spoilt village nestled in the richly forested Kumaon Hills.  

It is said that the village of the Belwal clan was founded by a group of pilgrims from Maharashtra, who had come on char dham yatra and chose to settle down here circa 17th Century.

References

Villages in Almora district